Alexander Grünwald (born 1 May 1989) is an Austrian former professional footballer who played as an attacking midfielder.

Career
Grünwald made his professional debut with the reserve team of Austria Wien in the First League.

Career statistics

References

1989 births
Living people
Association football midfielders
Austrian footballers
Austrian Football Bundesliga players
2. Liga (Austria) players
SC Wiener Neustadt players
SV Wienerberger players
FK Austria Wien players
Austrian Regionalliga players